The basketball tournaments of UAAP Season 76  were held in school year 2013-14. Adamson University was both season host and basketball tournaments host. As season host, Adamson was the producer of the opening ceremony on June 29, 2013. As to being tournament host, Adamson was responsible for the scheduling of games, booking of game venues and distribution of game tickets to member schools. The other responsibility of Adamson as tournament host was the nomination of a basketball tournament commissioner to the UAAP Board for approval.

The first doubleheader of basketball games was held after the opening ceremonies at the Mall of Asia Arena. ABS-CBN UHF channel Studio 23 did the broadcast of the men's basketball tournament for the fourteenth consecutive year.

Men's tournament

Teams

Coaching changes

Elimination round

Team standings

Schedule

Results

Second–seed playoff

Bracket

* Game went into overtime.

Semifinals
In the semifinals, the higher seed has the twice-to-beat advantage, where they only have to win once, while their opponents twice, to progress.

NU vs. UST

La Salle vs. FEU
The De La Salle Green Archers has the twice-to-beat advantage after beating the FEU Tamaraws for the second-seed, which leads to a virtual best-of-three playoff series.

Finals

 Finals Most Valuable Player:

Awards

 Most Valuable Player: 
 Rookie of the Year: 
 Mythical Five:
 
 
 
 
 
 Suzuki Fast Break Player of the Season: 
 Yellow Cab Big Man of the Season: 
 RCBC Savings Bank Game Changing Player of the Season: 
 Jollibee Champ of the Season: 
 Appeton Most Improved Player of the Season: 
 PSBank Maaasahan Player of the Year:

Women's tournament

Elimination round

Team standings

Schedule

Results

Bracket

* Game went into overtime.

Semifinals
In the semifinals, the higher seed has the twice-to-beat advantage, where they only have to win once, while their opponents twice, to progress.

NU vs. Adamson

La Salle vs. UST

Finals

 Finals Most Valuable Player 
All finals games were aired by Studio 23 on a delayed basis on the same day the games were played.

Awards

 Most Valuable Player: 
 Rookie of the Year: 
 Mythical Five:

Juniors' tournament

Elimination round

Team standings

Schedule

Results

Bracket
* Game went into overtime.

Stepladder semifinals

First round
This was a one-game playoff.

Second round
In the semifinals, Ateneo has the twice-to-beat advantage, where they only have to win once, while their opponents twice, to progress.

Finals
NU has to win two times, while their opponent has to win three times, to win the championship.

 Finals Most Valuable Player: 
Both finals games were aired by Studio 23 on a delayed basis on October 10.

Awards

  Most Valuable Player: 
 Rookie of the Year: 
 Mythical Five:

Overall championship points

In case of ties, the team with the higher position in any tournament is ranked higher; if both are still tied, they are listed by alphabetical order.

Seniors' division

Juniors' division

See also
NCAA Season 89 basketball tournaments

References

76
2013–14 in Philippine college basketball
Basket